Waverley is a town located in the South Taranaki District in New Zealand. It is 44 km northwest of Whanganui. Patea is 17 km to the west, and Waitōtara is 10 km to the southeast. State Highway 3 and the Marton - New Plymouth Line railway run through the town.

History and culture

Waverley was an important colonial stronghold during the New Zealand Wars of the 1860s, during which time the town was called Wairoa. The town is well known for its farming and thoroughbred stables. The race horse Kiwi was trained in the paddocks of a Waverley sheep farm by owner Snow Lupton and went on to go from last on the final bend to win the 1983 Melbourne Cup.

Marae

The local Te Wairoa-iti Marae and Maruata meeting house are a meeting place for Ngāti Tai, a hapū of Ngā Rauru Kītahi.

Ironsand mining and renewable energy

The Waipipi onshore ironsand mine operated near Waverley from 1971 to 1987, producing a total of 15.7 million tonnes of concentrate for export. The Waipipi site is now being developed for the Waipipi Wind Farm, with 31 turbines generating up to 133 MW.

Demographics

The population of Waverley was 819 in the 2018 New Zealand census, an increase of 21 (2.6%) since the 2013 census, and a decrease of 39 (-4.5%) since the 2006 census. There were 408 males and 411 females, giving a sex ratio of 0.99 males per female. Ethnicities were 627 people  (76.6%) European/Pākehā, 258 (31.5%) Māori, 27 (3.3%) Pacific peoples, and 15 (1.8%) Asian (totals add to more than 100% since people could identify with multiple ethnicities). Of the total population, 138 people  (16.8%) were under 15 years old, 126 (15.4%) were 15–29, 354 (43.2%) were 30–64, and 201 (24.5%) were over 65.

Manutahi-Waitotora

Manutahi-Waitotora had a population of 1,980 at the 2018 New Zealand census, a decrease of 12 people (-0.6%) since the 2013 census, and a decrease of 102 people (-4.9%) since the 2006 census. There were 834 households. There were 1,032 males and 948 females, giving a sex ratio of 1.09 males per female. The median age was 42.4 years (compared with 37.4 years nationally), with 393 people (19.8%) aged under 15 years, 327 (16.5%) aged 15 to 29, 891 (45.0%) aged 30 to 64, and 366 (18.5%) aged 65 or older.

Ethnicities were 81.1% European/Pākehā, 27.6% Māori, 2.9% Pacific peoples, 2.7% Asian, and 1.2% other ethnicities (totals add to more than 100% since people could identify with multiple ethnicities).

The proportion of people born overseas was 7.6%, compared with 27.1% nationally.

Although some people objected to giving their religion, 50.2% had no religion, 38.2% were Christian, 0.3% were Hindu, 0.2% were Muslim and 2.6% had other religions.

Of those at least 15 years old, 141 (8.9%) people had a bachelor or higher degree, and 495 (31.2%) people had no formal qualifications. The median income was $26,700, compared with $31,800 nationally. The employment status of those at least 15 was that 756 (47.6%) people were employed full-time, 228 (14.4%) were part-time, and 63 (4.0%) were unemployed.

Features

Waverley has a large sawmill which employs around 48 staff. The mill is the only major sawmill as far as New Plymouth in the north and Levin in the south.

Waverley has a black sand beach, the colour is due to iron sand deposits. The campground at the beach is well used in the summer months, as the beach provides safe surfing. Waverley has a number of cafes and coffee shops and is a popular place for tourists to stop for a break before entering the Taranaki region.

Waverley and surrounding community has a South Taranaki District Council LibraryPlus, which provides a full library service and Council related services. These services include being able to register your dog, pay your rates or inquire about obtaining a building permit. Other services include a Tot Time for the under 5s and bookclub catering to intermediate and high school age children. The LibraryPlus also has three APN computers, offering free internet and Skype to the public.

Waverley has a small skatepark as well as a playground in the town park that can be seen off the main road that runs through Waverley. Also there are well kept tennis courts and on Brassey St there is a small dirt jump track for push bikes. The locals call it the BMX track. The cave at Waverley's cave beach has collapsed due to erosion.

Education
Waverley Primary School is a co-educational contributing primary (years 1–8) school with a roll of  students as of  Public education started in the area in 1873. Waverley High School closed on 20 April 2007, after its NCEA assessments were found to be unreliable.

Notes

External links
Waverley Way

Populated places in Taranaki
South Taranaki District